The Performance Ranking of Scientific Papers for World Universities or NTU Ranking is a ranking system of world universities by scientific paper volume, impact, and performance output. The ranking was originally published from 2007 to 2011 by the Higher Education Evaluation and Accreditation Council of Taiwan (HEEACT) and has been published since 2012 by the National Taiwan University. It uses bibliometric methods to analyze and rank the scientific paper performance. In addition to the overall ranking, it includes a list of the top universities in six fields and fourteen subjects.

The rankings were introduced in 2007. The original ranking methodology favored toward universities with medical schools. In 2008, HEEACT began publishing a "Field Based Ranking" including six fields: agriculture and environmental sciences (AGE), clinical medicine (MED), engineering, computing, and technology (ENG), life sciences (LIFE), natural sciences (SCI), and social sciences (SOC).

In 2010, HEEACT began publishing subject rankings in fields of various field of science and technology. Science fields are divided into physics, chemistry, mathematics, and geosciences. Technology fields are split up into electrical engineering, computer science, mechanical engineering, chemical engineering (including energy and fuels), materials science, and civil engineering (including environmental engineering).

HEEACT ended the Performance Ranking of Scientific Papers for World Universities Project in 2012. Due to disagreement about ranking results, the Taiwanese education authorities announced that the government would no longer support the Higher Education Evaluation and Accreditation Council of Taiwan to do this ranking.

The Performance Ranking of Scientific Papers for World Universities has been published by the National Taiwan University since 2012, and the ranking is also known as the NTU Ranking.

Methodology 
The HEEACT rankings used the following criteria: 
 Research productivity (weighed 20%)—The number of published articles of the last 11 years (10%) and the number of articles of the current year (10%). 
 Research impact (weighed 30%)—Number of citations of the last 11 years (10%), the number of citations of the last two years (10%), and the average number of citations of the last 11 years (10%).
 Research excellence (weighed 40%)—The h-index of the last two years (20%), the number of highly cited papers (15%), and the number of articles of the current year in high-impact journals (15%).

Quantitative data were drawn from Science Citation Index (SCI) and Social Sciences Citation Index (SSCI). The data were normalized by faculty number to account for different institution sizes. The indicators used in this methodology highly emphasized research quality (80% of the performance score) and short-term research performance (55% of the score).

HEEACT World University Rankings (Top 50)

HEEACT World University Rankings (Top 20 by field)

Agriculture & Environment Sciences

Clinical Medicine

Engineering, Computing & Technology

Life Sciences

Physical, Chemical

Social Sciences

HEEACT World University Rankings (Top 20 by subject)

Physics (includes Astronomy and Space Science)

Chemistry

Mathematics

Geosciences

Electrical Engineering

Computer Science

Civil Engineering (including Environmental Engineering)

Mechanical Engineering

Chemical Engineering (including Energy & Fuels)

Materials Science

Commentary 
The Australian higher education indicated that the 2007 performance ranking of scientific papers for world universities produced by HEEACT is a useful addition to the present world university ranks because of its rigorous method and robust results, which are made possible by its more modest scope. There are more comments on the HEEACT rankings. The senior research fellow of Institute of Scientific and Technical Information of China, Wu Yi-shan, claimed that the HEEACT ranking is the best ranking system he has ever seen. Wu indicated that the HEEACT ranking considers both long-term and short-term performance of a university. The idea of combining long-term and short-term ranking indicators is a pioneering thought.  Richard Holmes posted on University Ranking Watch and noted: "Although the Shanghai rankings show a high correlation with other rankings (based on a tiny sample of US universities) the HEEACT rankings from Taiwan do somewhat better." Vice-president Research for the University of Toronto, Professor Paul Young, remarked that "the HEEACT rankings are relatively new, they are an important and methodologically robust measure of the quantity and quality of research performed by universities around the world." The dean of academic affairs at National Taiwan University, Chiang Been-Huang, stated that "2009 Performance Ranking of Scientific Papers for World Universities by HEEACT are conducted based on objective figures."

See also
 College and university rankings
 Academic Ranking of World Universities
 Times Higher Education World University Rankings
 QS World University Rankings
 Webometrics Ranking of World Universities
 Global University Ranking

Notes and references 

University and college rankings
Science and technology in Taiwan